Papilio lampsacus is a species of swallowtail butterfly from the genus Papilio that is found in west Java, Indonesia. It is very rare, and there are few recently confirmed sightings.

References

lampsacus
Butterflies described in 1836
Butterflies of Indonesia
Taxa named by Jean Baptiste Boisduval